The 2019–20 season was West Ham Uniteds eighth consecutive campaign in the Premier League since being promoted in the 2011–12 season. It is West Ham's 24th Premier League campaign overall and their 62nd top flight appearance in their 125th year in existence.

In addition to the Premier League, West Ham United participated in the FA Cup entering in the third round before being eliminated by West Bromwich Albion in the fourth round. They also played in the EFL Cup, entering at the second round before being eliminated the third round by Oxford United of League One.

The season was suspended following a decision on 13 March 2020 by the Premier League to suspend the league after a number of players and other club staff became ill due to the coronavirus pandemic. The initial suspension was until 4 April, which was then extended.  The FA then agreed to extend the season indefinitely, past the scheduled end date of 1 June. The season resumed on 19 June, with West Ham playing their first match since suspension the following day, losing 0–2 at home to Wolverhampton Wanderers. All matches from this date were played behind closed doors with no paying supporters and an attendance limited to 300 key people, although all West Ham's remaining fixtures were broadcast live on television or streaming platforms.

On 11 July, Michail Antonio scored all four goals in a 4–0 away victory over Norwich City. Antonio became the first West Ham player to score four times in a single Premier League match and the first in any league game since David Cross in 1981.

Season squad

Transfers

Transfers in

Loans in

Loans out

Transfers out

Released

Pre-season
West Ham United confirmed on 26 March that they would be taking part in the 2019 Premier League Asia Trophy in China, alongside Newcastle United, Wolverhampton Wanderers and Premier League champions Manchester City. This will be West Ham's second appearance in the bi-annual competition, after finishing third in the 2009 edition. It was later announced on 13 May that West Ham would face Manchester City in the semi-finals, at the same time that ticket details were revealed.

Competitions

Premier League

League table

Results summary

Results by matchday

Matches
On 13 June 2019, the Premier League fixtures were announced.

FA Cup

The third round draw was made live on BBC Two from Etihad Stadium, Micah Richards and Tony Adams conducted the draw. The fourth round draw was made by Alex Scott and David O'Leary on Monday, 6 January.

EFL Cup

The second round draw was made on 13 August 2019 following the conclusion of all but one first round matches. The third round draw was confirmed on 28 August 2019, live on Sky Sports.

Statistics

Appearances and goals

|-
! colspan=14 style=background:#dcdcdc; text-align:center| Goalkeepers

|-
! colspan=14 style=background:#dcdcdc; text-align:center| Defenders

|-
! colspan=14 style=background:#dcdcdc; text-align:center| Midfielders

|-
! colspan=14 style=background:#dcdcdc; text-align:center| Forwards

|-
! colspan=14 style=background:#dcdcdc; text-align:center| Players who left the club permanently or on loan during the season

|-
|}

Goalscorers

References

West Ham United F.C. seasons
West Ham United
West Ham United
West Ham United